The Ordnance Factories Board Nidar is a lightweight revolver manufactured by the Ordnance Factories Board of India. It is intended for concealed carry.

History
The revolver's name means "fearless" in Hindi. Like the earlier Nirbheek revolver, it was named for the victim of the 2012 Delhi gang rape, whom the Indian press nicknamed "Nirbhaya".

The revolver received 100 orders on the first day after its launch in 2016. The manufacturer stated that they expected to sell 10,000 revolvers.

Design
The Nidar revolver is chambered for the .22 Long Rifle cartridge. It is made with an aluminium alloy to reduce the weight of the revolver. According to a Rifle Factory Ishapore representative, the alloy is known as "DTD1524". It has a weight of 250 grams.

It has a capacity of 8 rounds.

The revolver has a conventional double- or single-action trigger.

References

External links
 

Weapons of India
Revolvers of India